James McGiffen (30 January 1904 – 3 August 1929) was an English professional footballer who played as an outside left in the Football League for Darlington. He also played non-league football as an amateur for Stockton.

Life and career
McGiffen, the third child of John McGiffen, an iron worker, and his wife Alice, was born in 1904 in South Bank, in the North Riding of Yorkshire, and raised in Stockton-on-Tees, County Durham.

By 1924, he was playing football for his hometown club, the amateur club Stockton F.C.; he scored in a 9–4 defeat to Ferryhill Athletic on the last day of the 1923–24 Northern League season. The Daily Express preview of Stockton's Amateur Cup tie against London Caledonians in 1926 described the youthful McGiffen as "very fast and tricky, with a penchant for goals". He helped Stockton win the Northern League Challenge Cup in 1926–27, before leaving the club at the end of the season to turn professional with Third Division North club Darlington.

McGiffen scored in Darlington's 9–3 win against Lincoln City in January 1928, and according to the Burnley Express, he was the pick of their forwards as he scored twice in a 4–2 defeat of Nelson in April. By the end of his second season with the club, McGiffen had made 23 League appearances and scored four times. He was included on Darlington's retained list, and was reported to have signed on again for the coming season.

At the end of July, he underwent a mastoid operation in Stockton Hospital; he died there three days later, on 3 August, at the age of 25.

References

1904 births
1929 deaths
People from South Bank, Redcar and Cleveland
Footballers from North Yorkshire
English footballers
Association football wingers
Stockton F.C. players
Darlington F.C. players
Northern Football League players
English Football League players